Hepi is both a surname and a given name. Notable people with the name include:

Brad Hepi (born 1968), New Zealand rugby league player
Hepi Te Heuheu (1919–1997), Māori tribal leader
Tyla Hepi (born 1993), New Zealand rugby league footballer, son of Brad